Black Gold is a 1962 adventure film directed by Leslie H. Martinson and written by Bob Duncan, Wanda Duncan and Harry Whittington . The film stars Philip Carey, Diane McBain, James Best, Fay Spain, Claude Akins and William Edward Phipps.

The film was released by Warner Bros. on July 21, 1962.

Plot
An Oklahoma farmer discovers oil on his land.

Cast
 Philip Carey as Frank McCandless
 Diane McBain as Ann Evans
 James Best as Jericho Larkin
 Fay Spain as Julie
 Claude Akins as Chick Carrington
 William Edward Phipps as Albert Mailer
 Dub Taylor as Doc
 Ken Mayer as Felker
 Iron Eyes Cody as Charlie Two-Bits
 Vincent Barbi as Klein
 Rusty Wescoatt as Wilkins

See also
 List of American films of 1962

References

External links
 
 
 

1962 films
Warner Bros. films
American adventure films
1962 adventure films
Films directed by Leslie H. Martinson
Works about petroleum
1960s English-language films
1960s American films